Trachipterus trachypterus, is a ribbonfish of the family Trachipteridae, found in tropical and subtropical seas worldwide.  Its length is up to 3 m.

References

 
 Tony Ayling & Geoffrey Cox, Collins Guide to the Sea Fishes of New Zealand,  (William Collins Publishers Ltd, Auckland, New Zealand 1982) 

Trachipteridae
Fish described in 1789
Taxa named by Johann Friedrich Gmelin